Paul Damian Madden  (born 25 April 1959) is a retired British diplomat, who was High Commissioner to Singapore and to Australia, and Ambassador to Japan between 2017 and 2021.

Education
Madden was educated at The King's School, Ottery St Mary, and Gonville and Caius College, Cambridge, where he gained a BA degree in economic geography (later upgraded to MA). He has a Master of Business Administration degree from Durham University. He is a Fellow of the Royal Geographical Society.

In 1983, Madden entered an essay contest sponsored by the Japanese Ministry of Foreign Affairs and was granted a study tour in Japan. He learned Japanese at the University of London, School of Oriental and African Studies and the British Embassy's school in Kamakura.

Career
Madden began his career in the Department of Trade and Industry where he was Private Secretary to the Minister 1984–86. He then studied Japanese at the School of Oriental and African Studies, University of London, and at Kamakura, Kanagawa, Japan, before joining the Diplomatic Service. He served at the Embassy in Tokyo 1988–92, at the Foreign and Commonwealth Office (FCO), dealing with EU enlargement and Environmental issues, 1992–96, and at the Embassy in Washington, D.C. 1996–2000. He was Deputy High Commissioner in Singapore 2000–03, assistant director of Information at the FCO 2003–04, and managing director at UK Trade & Investment 2004–06. He was British High Commissioner in Singapore 2007–11 and High Commissioner to Australia 2011–15.

Madden was appointed Companion of the Order of St Michael and St George (CMG) in the 2013 Birthday Honours, for services to the UK and improving UK-Australian relations.

In April 2016 Madden was appointed British Ambassador to Japan in succession to Tim Hitchens. He took up his appointment in January 2017 as planned.

As ambassador to Japan

On 18 January 2017, Madden completed the Ceremony of the Presentation of Credentials which was held at Tokyo Imperial Palace.

Madden represented UK-Japan relations during a period in which the two countries had £32 billion in bilateral yearly trade. He oversaw regular visits to Japan by the Royal Navy during a period of increased tensions with China and North Korea. He also supported the creation of the UK-Japan Comprehensive Economic Partnership Agreement in the aftermath of Britain's departure from the European Union and successfully lobbied the Japanese government to support the UK's application to join the Comprehensive and Progressive Agreement for Trans-Pacific Partnership.

On 6 August 2017, Madden attended the Hiroshima Peace Memorial Ceremony held in Hiroshima City.

In 2019, Madden accompanied the Prince of Wales to the enthronement of Emperor Naruhito and attended the 2019 Rugby World Cup, which was hosted by Japan.

In February 2020, SARS-CoV-2 reached Japan on board the Japanese-built, British-registered Diamond Princess cruise ship. Madden worked with Japanese authorities to arrange evacuation from the ship.

Madden retired in March 2021 and was replaced as Ambassador to Japan by Julia Longbottom.

Bibliography

Books

Plays
Madden wrote a play, "Alternate Serve", that was played at the Sydney Short and Sweet Theatre Festival, on 28 January 2015.

Book reviews

References

External links
 MADDEN, Paul Damian, Who's Who 2013, A & C Black, 2013; online edn, Oxford University Press, Dec 2012

1959 births
Living people
High Commissioners of the United Kingdom to Australia
High Commissioners of the United Kingdom to Singapore
Ambassadors of the United Kingdom to Japan
Alumni of Gonville and Caius College, Cambridge
Alumni of Durham University
Alumni of SOAS University of London
People from Ottery St Mary
Companions of the Order of St Michael and St George
Fellows of the Royal Geographical Society
20th-century British diplomats
21st-century British diplomats